Lenagan Island is an island in the Republic of Trinidad and Tobago.  It is one of “The Five Islands” group of six small islands lying west of Port of Spain in the Gulf of Paria.

See also
 List of islands of Trinidad and Tobago

Islands of Trinidad and Tobago
Gulf of Paria